The Europe Zone was the unique zone within Group 4 of the regional Davis Cup competition in 2022. The zone's competition was held in round robin format in Baku, Azerbaijan, from 27 to 31 July 2022.

Participating nations

Draw
Date: 27–30 July 2022

Location: Baku Tennis Academy, Baku, Azerbaijan (hard)

Format: Round-robin basis. One pool of four teams and one pool of three teams. The top two finishers of each pool will play-off against each other to determine the two nations promoted to Europe Group III in 2023.

Seeding

 1Davis Cup Rankings as of 8 March 2022

Round Robin

Pool A

Pool B
 
Standings are determined by: 1. number of wins; 2. number of matches; 3. in two-team ties, head-to-head records; 4. in three-team ties, (a) percentage of sets won (head-to-head records if two teams remain tied), then (b) percentage of games won (head-to-head records if two teams remain tied), then (c) Davis Cup rankings.

Playoffs

Round Robin

Pool A

San Marino vs. Albania

Iceland vs. Albania

San Marino vs. Iceland

Pool B

Malta vs. Kosovo

Andorra vs. Azerbaijan

Malta vs. Azerbaijan

Andorra vs. Kosovo

Malta vs. Andorra

Azerbaijan vs. Kosovo

Play-offs

Promotional play-offs

San Marino vs. Azerbaijan

Malta vs. Iceland

5th-place play-offs

Albania vs. Andorra

References

External links
Official Website

Davis Cup Europe/Africa Zone
Europe Zone